Nachtegalen Park (Nightingale Park in ) is a park located in the Antwerp, Belgium municipality of Wilrijk. It served as the archery venue for the 1920 Summer Olympics.

During World War II, the park was headquarters for the 89th German Army Corps, then it became command post of the 719th Infantry Division.

The park is home to the Atlantic Wall & Air War Bunker Museum.

References
Antwerp bunker museum profile.
Sports-reference.com 1920 Summer Olympics archery profile.

Venues of the 1920 Summer Olympics
Olympic archery venues
Parks in Belgium
Tourist attractions in Antwerp